St. Boniface is a provincial electoral division in the Canadian province of Manitoba. It should not be confused with the federal electoral division of the same name, which includes most of the provincial riding's territory but has expanded boundaries and a larger population base. The riding has existed, in one form or another, since the province's creation.

In Manitoba's first general election (1870), the riding was divided into St. Boniface East and St. Boniface West.  It became a single constituency in 1874, and has existed continuously since then.

The St. Boniface constituency elected its representation by preferential balloting from 1926 to 1953, a single member by instant runoff voting from 1926 to 1945 and two members by single transferable voting in 1949 and 1953. On all other occasions, it has been a single-member constituency, electing its member by First Past The Post.

St. Boniface is located in the central-eastern Winnipeg. Its boundaries roughly correspond with the historical community of Saint Boniface, Manitoba, which was a distinct civic jurisdiction before being amalgamated with the City of Winnipeg in 1971.

The riding's population in 1996 was 19,646. The average family income in 1999 was $45,193, with an unemployment rate of 10.5%. The service sector accounts for 18% of the riding's industry, with a further 15% in health and social services.

St. Boniface has historically been home to the largest francophone community in the Winnipeg area. According to a 1999 census, 34% of the riding's residents speak French as their first language—the highest rate in the province.  The riding's aboriginal population is 8%, and almost 19% of the population is over 65 years of age.

For many years after the introduction of partisan politics in 1882, St. Boniface was a hotly contested battleground riding between the provincial Liberals and Conservatives (although candidates of the parliamentary left were also elected in the 1930s and 1940s). During the 1950s and 1960s, it was generally regarded as a safe seat for the Liberals.

In 1969, St. Boniface MLA Laurent Desjardins decided to sit as a Liberal Democrat, supporting the New Democratic Party government of Edward Schreyer. He formally joined the NDP in 1971, and aside from an overturned election result in 1973, continued to represent the area until 1988.

The provincial Liberals recaptured the seat in 1988, during a period of resurgence for that party in the province. After Neil Gaudry's death in 1999, Greg Selinger recaptured the seat for the NDP. He was reelected in 2003 with about 75 percent of the popular vote, and was named premier of Manitoba in 2009.

Selinger left politics two years after the NDP was heavily defeated at the 2016 provincial election, and newly elected Liberal leader Dougald Lamont won the seat at the ensuing by-election.

Members of the Legislative Assembly

St. Boniface East (1870-1874)

St. Boniface West (1870-1874)

St. Boniface (single-member riding, 1874-1949)

St. Boniface (two-member riding, 1949-1958)

St. Boniface (single-member riding, 1958-)

Electoral results

1874 general election

1878 general election

1879 general election

1882 by-election

1883 general election

1886 general election

1888 general election

1892 general election

1896 general election

1897 by-election

1899 general election

1900 by-election

1903 general election

1907 general election

1910 general election

1913 by-election

1914 general election

1915 general election

1920 general election

1922 general election

1927 general election

1932 general election

1936 general election

1941 general election

1945 general election

1949 general election

1953 general election

1958 general election

1959 general election

1962 general election

1966 general election

1969 general election

1973 general election

1974 by-election

1977 general election

1981 general election

1986 general election

1988 general election

1990 general election

1995 general election

1999 general election

2003 general election

2007 general election

2011 general election

2016 general election

2018 by-election

2019 general election

Previous boundaries

References

Manitoba provincial electoral districts
Politics of Winnipeg
Saint Boniface, Winnipeg